Thach, also spelled Thatch, is an unincorporated community in Limestone County, Alabama, United States.

History
Thach is likely named after the Thach family, who were early settlers of the area. A post office operated under the name Thatch from 1921 to 1933.

References

Unincorporated communities in Limestone County, Alabama
Unincorporated communities in Alabama